David Lynn (born July 13, 1983) is a former professional rugby league footballer who played in the 2000s. He played as a  forward at representative level for Scotland, and at club level for the Edinburgh Eagles.

International honours
David Lynn won caps for Scotland while at Edinburgh Eagles 2007 1-cap + 1-cap (sub).

References

1983 births
Living people
Edinburgh Eagles players
Place of birth missing (living people)
Rugby league second-rows
Scotland national rugby league team players